Christopher Crowe  (c.1681 – 9 November 1749), was an English consul and landowner.

In 1705, aged 24, Crowe was appointed British Consul at Livorno, Italy.  He was awarded the "lucrative" contract to supply the British Mediterranean fleet with wine and olive oil during the War of the Spanish Succession, from 1703 to 1711.  

He also worked as a prize agent for captured enemy merchant ships, and acquired artworks on behalf of the English nobility, and grew rich.  

In 1707, he bought Woodford Hall, a large house and estate in Woodford, Essex, adjacent to Epping Forest from Sir Richard Child.

In 1715, he married Charlotte Lee, Lady Baltimore who had been married to Benedict Leonard Calvert, 4th Baron Baltimore, and they had four children.

In 1728, he sold Woodford Hall to William Hunt in 1727, having obtained a private Act of Parliament to do so..

References

1681 births
1749 deaths
English diplomats
English landowners